Deane is a surname and given name; typically a variant of the English Dean. In Ireland it is of Hiberno-Norman origin, where the family were one of the famed Tribes of Galway.

People with the surname 
 Anthony Deane (disambiguation), several people
 Brian Deane (born 1968), English footballer
 Charles Deane (disambiguation), several people
 Charlotte Deane (born 1975), British scientist
 Col Deane (1900–1952), Australian footballer
 Disque Deane (1921–2010), American financier and investor
 Edna Deane (1905–1995), English ballroom dancer, choreographer and author
 Frederic Deane (1868–1952), bishop of Aberdeen and Orkney
 Gilbert A. Deane (1851–1891), New York politician
 Harold Arthur Deane (1854–1908), administrator in British India
 Henry Deane (disambiguation), several people
 J. A. Deane, musician
 Joe Deane (born 1977), Irish hurling player
 John Deane (disambiguation), several people
 Marjorie Deane (1914-2008), British financial journalist and author
 Marjorie S. Deane, (1923-2003), American fashion authority
 Mary Bathurst Deane (1843–1940), English novelist
 Matthew Deane (born 1978), Thai singer, actor and television presenter
 Nummy Deane (1895–1939), South African cricketer
 Phyllis Deane (1918-2012), British economic historian
 Raymond Deane (born 1953), Irish composer
 Richard Deane (disambiguation), several people
 Robert Deane (disambiguation), several people
 Roderick Deane (born 1941), New Zealand economist, public sector reformer, and businessman
 Ruthven Deane (1851–1934), American ornithologist
 Seamus Deane (1940–2021), Irish poet, critic and novelist
 Silas Deane (1737–1789), US diplomat
 Sydney Deane (1863–1934), cricketer and entertainer, first Australian to appear in a Hollywood movie
 Sir Thomas Deane (1792–1871), Irish architect and Mayor of Cork
 Sir Thomas Newenham Deane (1828–1899), Irish architect and son of Thomas Deane
 Sir Thomas Manly Deane (1851–1933), Irish architect and son of Thomas Newenham Deane
 Walter Deane (1848–1930), American botanist and ornithologist
 William Deane (born 1931), Australian statesman
 William Deane (cricketer) (1857–1936), English cricketer

As a given name 
 Deane Beman (born 1938), American golfer
 Deane C. Davis (1900–1990), Governor of Vermont
 Deane R. Hinton (1923–2017), career US diplomat and ambassador
 Deane Keller (1901–1992), American artist, academic, soldier, art restorer and preservationist
 Deane Leonard (born 1999), American football player
 Deane Montgomery (1909–1992), mathematician
 Deane Wells, Australian politician

References